Eupithecia superata is a moth in the family Geometridae. It is found in north-eastern India.

The wingspan is about 20 mm. The forewings are pale ochreous with a soft pink tinge and the hindwings are whitish ochreous.

References

Moths described in 2010
superata
Moths of Asia